Tessonnière is a former commune in the department of Deux-Sèvres in western France. On 1 January 2019 it was merged into the commune of Airvault.

Population

See also
Communes of the Deux-Sèvres department

References

Former communes of Deux-Sèvres